The Archdeacon of Dunblane was the only archdeacon in the Diocese of Dunblane, acting as a deputy of the Bishop of Dunblane. The first archdeacon, Andrew (Aindréas), was called "Archdeacon of Modhel" (Muthill); archdeacons Jonathan, Gilbert and Luke were styled "Archdeacon of Dunblane", while John and Duncan were called "Archdeacon of Strathearn". It is only from Augustine of Nottingham that the title settles at "of Dunblane". The following is a list of archdeacons:

List of archdeacons
 Andrew, fl. 1165 x 1171
 Jonathan, fl. 1178 x 1197-x 1198
 John, x 1199-1203 x 1210
 Gilbert (Gille Brighde), x 1210-1235
 Luke de Muthill, 1239-1240
 Duncan (Donnchadh), fl. 1240 x 1255
 Augustine of Nottingham, fl. 1268-1283
 Walter of Montrose, 1287-1296
 William of Yetholm, fl. 1309 x 1313-1320 x 1321
 Thomas, fl. 1322 x 1328
 Walter de Coventry, fl. 1345
 Nicholas de Kinbuck, fl. 1358-1360
 Andrew Magnus, x 1365-1372
 David Bell, 1375-1377
 Maurice of Strathearn, 1377-1398
 Fionnlagh MacCailein,  1400 x 1402-1403
 Thomas Graham, 1410 x 1411-1414 x 1419
 Walter Stewart, x 1433-1456 x
 Andrew Purves, x 1474-1479 x 1480
 Alexander Rate x 1474-1479 x 1480
 William Scheves, 1474
 Duncan Bulle, 1480-1490
 Henry Allan, 1492-1504
 John Doby, 1506-1513
 Patrick Blackadder, d. 1519
 George Newton, 1521-1531 x 1533
 John Chisholm, 1531-1542
 John Danielston, 1542-1545
 William Gordon, 1545
 John Thornton, 1545
 George Wawane, x 1550-1558 x 1564
 James Chisholm, 1566-1595
 Patrick Stirling, 1606-1607
 Alexander Gaw, 1610-1615
 John Fife, 1616-1633
 William Bannatyne, 1635

Notes

Bibliography
 Watt, D.E.R., Fasti Ecclesiae Scotinanae Medii Aevi ad annum 1638, 2nd Draft, (St Andrews, 1969), pp. 88–91

See also
 Bishop of Dunblane

Dunblane
History of Stirling (council area)
People associated with Stirling (council area)